Post Office Road (currently known as the Millennium Stadium for sponsorship purposes) is a rugby league ground in Featherstone, near Pontefract, West Yorkshire, England. It is the home of rugby league club Featherstone Rovers. The ground's current capacity is 6,954.

History
The ground opened in 1904 and has been used by the club since their formation in 1908. The record attendance is 17,000 from a 1957 game against St. Helens.

In 2011, fans bought stands from the defunct Scarborough F.C.'s McCain Stadium and erected them at the railway end of the ground, replacing the terracing.

Layout

North Stand

Capacity-  (seated)
The North Stand or Railway End is the newest part of the ground after originally being terracing it was replaced in 2014 with seated stands which were taken from Scarborough's McCain Stadium. The North-East corner houses the scoreboard.

East Stand

Capacity-  (seated)
The Eastern side of the ground has two covered seated stands. The main stand on the halfway line houses bars and toilets while towards the Northern end of the ground, the smaller stand was erected in 2014 after it was relocated from  Scarborough's McCain Stadium. To the Southern end of the stand there is a small amount of uncovered terracing.

South Stand

Capacity-  (standing)
The South Stand or Post Office Road End is located behind the goal posts and is open terracing. Terrace houses overlook behind the stand and people have been known to sit on the roofs and watch games.

West Stand

Capacity-  (seated)
The West Stand is the Main Stand in the ground. It contains covered seating, where the TV gantry is and a small amount of uncovered terracing towards the South end of the ground. Towards the North end of the ground is the hospitality building which is connected to the main stand and also houses the changing rooms.

Sponsorship and name changes
From 2007, it was announced that the ground would be renamed the Chris Moyles Stadium after the Radio 1 Disc Jockey. This decision attracted criticism from some fans who felt Moyles had nothing to do with the tradition of the club or rugby league (he was born in Leeds and is famously a loyal Leeds United fan). However others saw it as a positive, good move and good publicity for the team. Moyles did not pay any money in the deal but mentioned Featherstone Rovers occasionally on his breakfast show.  From 2009, the ground sponsorship was taken up by Bigfellas Nightclub following a two-year sponsorship deal.  In 2017 local health food business LD Nutrition signed a deal to sponsor the stadium.

Rugby League Test matches
List of international matches played at Post Office Road.

Rugby League Tour matches
Post Office Road also saw Featherstone  play host to various international touring teams from 1952–1994.

References

External links

The Stadium Featherstone Rovers

Buildings and structures in the City of Wakefield
Rugby league stadiums in England
Sport in the City of Wakefield
Sports venues in West Yorkshire
Sports venues completed in 1904
1904 establishments in England
Featherstone